Mentor Xhemajl Mazrekaj (born 8 February 1989) is an Albanian professional footballer who plays as a winger for Albanian club Laçi.

Club career

Prishtina

Loan at Partizani
On 31 July 2013, Mazrekaj was loaned for six months to Kategoria Superiore side Partizani, with an option to extend the deal for a further year. One month later, he made his debut in a 0–2 away win against Kastrioti after being named in the starting line-up.

Return to Partizani
On 13 December 2013, Mazrekaj become a permanent player of Partizani after agreeing to a three-year deal. Two days later, he played the first game as permanent player against Besa after being named in the starting line-up.

Return to Prishtina
On 25 July 2017, Mazrekaj returned to Football Superleague of Kosovo club Prishtina, and received squad number 10. On 20 August 2017, he made his debut in a 0–1 home defeat against Drita after being named in the starting line-up.

Ferizaj
On 6 September 2018, Mazrekaj joined Football Superleague of Kosovo side Ferizaj. Nine days later, he made his debut in a 0–0 away draw over his former club Prishtina after coming on as a substitute.

Fortuna Oslo and 2 Korriku
In January 2019, Mazrekaj signed with Norwegian club Fortuna Oslo, but he resigned again at the end of the month. He then signed on 20 February with First Football League of Kosovo club 2 Korriku for the remainder of the season. On 2 March 2019, Mazrekaj made his debut in a league match against Arbëria after being named in the starting line-up and scored his side's first goal during a 3–0 home win.

Llapi
On 12 August 2019, Mazrekaj signed a two-year contract with Football Superleague of Kosovo club Llapi. Nineteen days later, he made his debut in a 0–0 home draw against Ballkani after coming on as a substitute at 75th minute in place of Mergim Pefqeli.

Laçi
On 19 August 2020, Mazrekaj joined Kategoria Superiore side Laçi. Nine days later, he made his debut with Laçi in the 2020–21 UEFA Europa League first qualifying round match against the Azerbaijani side Keşla after coming on as a substitute at 120th minute in place of Teco.

References

External links

Profile at Albanian Football Association

1989 births
Living people
Sportspeople from Pristina
Kosovan footballers
Kosovan expatriate footballers
Kosovan expatriate sportspeople in Albania
Kosovan expatriate sportspeople in Norway
Albanian footballers
Albanian expatriate footballers
Albanian expatriate sportspeople in Kosovo
Albanian expatriate sportspeople in Norway
Association football wingers
Football Superleague of Kosovo players
FC Prishtina players
KF Ferizaj players
KF Llapi players
Kategoria Superiore players
FK Partizani Tirana players
KF Laçi players